This article details the Warrington Wolves Rugby League Football Club's 2017 season. This is the Wolves' 22nd consecutive season in the Super League.

Fixtures and results

Pre-season friendlies

World Club Series

Super League fixtures

Super League Super 8's - The Qualifiers

Challenge Cup

Transfers

In

Out

References

External links
Warrington Wolves Website
Warrington Wolves - SL Website

Warrington Wolves seasons
Super League XXII by club